Bonny River is a river in Rivers State, Nigeria. Water taxis which move along the river provide the connection between Bonny Island and Port Harcourt, the capital of Rivers State, which lies alongside the river.

See also
 Bonny Light oil
 Niger Delta

References

External links
 Photos of Bonny River

 
Rivers of Rivers State